Gog is a genus of large, flattened asaphid trilobite from the Middle Arenig-aged Svalbard, Valhallfonna Formation, Olenidsletta,  Member, of Spitzbergen, Norway (G. catillus), and the Upper Arenig-aged Dawan Formation in Hubei, China (G. yangtzeensis).

References

Asaphidae
Ordovician trilobites
Fossils of Norway
Fossils of China
Fossil taxa described in 1975
Asaphida genera